Havârna is a commune in Botoșani County, Western Moldavia, Romania. It is composed of six villages: Balinți, Galbeni, Gârbeni, Havârna, Niculcea and Tătărășeni.

References

Communes in Botoșani County
Localities in Western Moldavia